Sébastien Chavanel (born 21 March 1981 in Châtellerault) is a retired French professional road bicycle racer who last rode for UCI ProTeam . He is a younger brother, by just under 2 years, to fellow professional cyclist Sylvain Chavanel.

At the 2015 Tour of Flanders, Chavanel sustained right thigh hematoma as a neutral service car rammed his team car which was stopped behind him to change his bike's wheel.

By finishing in last place in the 2015 Tour de France, he was that year's lanterne rouge rider.

Major results

2002
 1st La Côte Picarde
 1st Stage 3 Ronde de l'Isard
 5th Overall Tour du Loir-et-Cher
1st Stages 1 & 4
 7th Road race, UCI Road World Under-23 Championships
2003
 Tour de l'Avenir
1st Stages 2 & 3
2004
 Tour de l'Avenir
1st  Points classification
1st Stages 2, 4 & 5
 1st Stage 5 Tour de Wallonie
 4th Overall Tour de Picardie
2006
 1st Stage 3 GP Internacional da Costa Azul
2007
 1st Overall French Road Cycling Cup
 1st Grand Prix de Denain
 Étoile de Bessèges
1st  Points classification
1st Stage 5
 1st Stage 3 Tour de Picardie
 1st Stage 3 Tour de Poitou-Charentes et de la Vienne
 2nd Tro-Bro Léon
 3rd Grand Prix d'Isbergues
 4th Kuurne–Brussels–Kuurne
 5th Châteauroux Classic de l Indre
2008
 1st  Overall Tour de Picardie
1st  Points classification
1st Stage 4
 2nd Grand Prix de la Ville de Rennes
2009
 3rd Nokere Koerse
 5th Paris–Bourges
2010
 5th Paris–Bourges
 6th Grand Prix de Denain
 10th Paris–Tours
2011
 1st Stage 2 Circuit de Lorraine
 3rd La Roue Tourangelle
 5th Overall Tour de Wallonie
 6th Kuurne–Brussels–Kuurne
 8th Le Samyn
 9th Overall Driedaagse van West Vlaanderen
2012
 2nd Neuseen Classics
 7th Overall Tour de Picardie
 7th Kuurne–Brussels–Kuurne

References

External links 

Europcar Profile

French male cyclists
1981 births
Living people
People from Châtellerault
Sportspeople from Vienne
Cyclists from Nouvelle-Aquitaine
French people of Spanish descent